The following people have served as Ambassadors of India to Russia and its predecessor state, the Soviet Union:

Ambassador of India to the Soviet Union

Ambassador of India to Russia

See also
 Embassy of India School Moscow

References 

 
India
Russia